Extron Logistics, LLC is an American company  that provides solutions to supply chain operations.

History
Extron was founded in 1983 in San Jose, California.  The company relocated to Fremont, California in 1994 and has continued to expand.  Today, Extron occupies a  facility in Fremont and has customers in the Technology and Retail segments.

Management team
 Sandeep Duggal - chief executive officer
 Curt Cooper - VP of Customer Operations
 Kien Nguyen - Vice President of Operations
 Mark Lyell -Vice President of Business Development
 Linda St Claire - Corporate Controller

Acquisitions
On December 1, 2008, Extron Logistics, LLC acquired eCycle Inc, a provider of end-to-end server and storage rack configuration solutions. With this acquisition, Extron will now service mid and high-end Unix servers, storage systems and  peripherals, work stations (Unix, Linux, NT), LAPTOPS, PCs, printers, and voice and video Equipment, thus expanding Extron's markets to Web hosting, Internet Service Providers, Search Engine Operations  and Data Centers.

Extron capabilities
 Supply Chain Consultation, Analysis and Design Services
 Supply Base Qualification and Management
 Distribution & Fulfillment
 Systems Integration and Configuration (box build)
 Packaging configurations
 Forward Logistics and Distribution
 Reverse Logistics and Returns Management
 Distribution & Fulfillment
 Packaging configuration

Extron services
 Order Management
 Customer care
 eCommerce Solutions
 Fulfillment and Distribution
 Transportation Management
 Global Logistics
 Warehouse/Inventory Control
 Retail Configuration
 Kitting
Legal Disposition of Electronic Equipment
On-line Inquiry and Reporting

Market segments served
 Technology
 Retail
 Global OEMs

Clients
 Media, Inc
 Modulus Video Inc
 Meru Networks
 Motorola

References

Companies established in 1983
Companies based in Fremont, California